The Second Brightest Star is the eleventh studio album by the English progressive rock band Big Big Train. It contains a mix of new songs along with re-worked material from the band's previous two albums, Folklore and Grimspound.

Track listing

Personnel
Big Big Train
 Nick D'Virgilio – drums, percussion, backing vocals
 Dave Gregory – electric guitars
 Rachel Hall – violin, viola, cello, backing vocals
 David Longdon – lead vocals, flute, piano, electric guitars, mandolin, banjo, lute, celesta, synthesisers, percussion
 Danny Manners – keyboards, double bass
 Andy Poole – acoustic guitar, keyboards, backing vocals
 Rikard Sjöblom – electric guitars, backing vocals, keyboards on "The Second Brightest Star"
 Greg Spawton – bass guitar, bass pedals

Production
 Rob Aubrey – mixing, mastering
 Rachel Hall – string arrangements

References

Big Big Train albums
2017 albums